Montecorice is a town and comune in the province of Salerno in the Campania region of south-western Italy. As of 2011 its population was of

History
Montecorice likely originated as a small village around the monastery of Sant'Arcangelo, which existed as early as the 10th century.

Geography
The municipality is situated in the middle of Cilento region, bordering with the municipalities of Castellabate, Perdifumo, San Mauro Cilento and Serramezzana. The village is situated in a hilly area only 3 km from the coast.

It counts 7 hamlets (frazioni): Agnone Cilento, Case del Conte, Cosentini, Fornelli, Giungatelle, Ortodonico and Zoppi.

Economy
The economy is mostly based on agriculture (olives, figs, wine grape, fruit), animal husbandry and fishing. Summer tourism is developed in Agnone and its neighborhood.

Demographics

See also
Cilentan Coast
Cilentan dialect
Cilento and Vallo di Diano National Park

References

External links

Cities and towns in Campania
Localities of Cilento